Gessel is a surname of South German origin. Notable people with the surname include:

Ira Gessel (born 1951), American mathematician
Van C. Gessel (born 1950), American academic administrator
Sander van Gessel (born 1976), Dutch footballer

References

Surnames of German origin